Hispanic Causing Panic is the debut studio album by American rapper Kid Frost. It was released in 1990 via Virgin Records and is considered one of the first Latin rap albums, setting the stage for later releases by groups like Cypress Hill. Recording sessions took place at Wildcat Studios and Wide Tracks in Los Angeles, with producers Tony G, Will Roc, The Baka Boyz, Julio G and Kid Frost himself.

The album peaked at number 67 in the United States and at number 85 in the Netherlands, spawning two singles: "La Raza" and "¡That's It! (Ya Estuvo)". Its lead single, "La Raza", also charted in the Netherlands, Belgium and the United States, and would later feature in the popular video game Grand Theft Auto: San Andreas on Radio Los Santos.

Track listing

Personnel
Arturo Molina, Jr. – vocals, producer (tracks: 5, 6)
Mitch Rafel – saxophone (tracks: 1, 10)
Darrell "Bob Dog" Robertson – guitar (track 4)
Tommy D. – harmonica (track 6)
"Professor" Dwight Baldwin – percussion (tracks: 5, 6)
Antonio Gonzalez – percussion (tracks: 6, 7), producer (tracks: 1, 2, 5, 7, 10), co-producer (track 3)
Kevin Gilliam – scratches (tracks: 4, 9)
Julio Gonzalez – scratches & producer (track 7)
Nick Vidal – scratches (track 8), producer (tracks: 2, 3, 8)
Eric Vidal – producer (tracks: 2, 3, 8)
William L. Griffin – producer (tracks: 4, 6, 9), co-producer (track 8), mixing (track 10)
Mark Williams – mixing, A&R
Josh Schneider – recording, mixing (track 10)
David Grant – recording
Dennis "Def-Pea" Parker – recording
John Cavetello – recording
Stephen Marcussen – mastering
Melanie Nissen – art direction, photography
Steve J. Gerdes – design

Charts

References

External links

1990 debut albums
Frost (rapper) albums
Virgin Records albums